Frederick Boothe Stem (September 22, 1885 – September 5, 1964) is a former Major League Baseball first baseman. He played for the Boston Doves from 1908 to 1909. He attended college at the University of North Carolina.

External links

1885 births
1964 deaths
Major League Baseball first basemen
Baseball players from North Carolina
Boston Doves players
Stroudsburg (minor league baseball) players
Trenton Tigers players
Lynn Shoemakers players
Sioux City Packers players